SQL Server Pro was a monthly trade digital publication and website owned by Penton serving the information needs of IT Professionals in various fields including data processing, database administration, database development, computer-related consulting, and many other areas.

The company had editorial offices in the San Francisco Bay Area and Fort Collins, Colorado, USA.

Established in 1999, SQL Server Pro was a website for Microsoft SQL Server professionals. Common topics of the website and digital publication included:
SQL Server Administration
Backup and Recovery
High Availability
Performance Tuning
Security
Storage
Virtualization
SQL Server Development
ASP.NET
Entity Framework
PowerShell
T-SQL
Visual Studio
SQL Server 2014
SQL Server 2012
SQL Server 2008
SQL Server 2005
Business Intelligence
SQL Server Analysis Services
SQL Server Integration Services
SQL Server Reporting Services
SQL Server Pro and its sister magazine, Windows IT Pro, reach very similar audiences. SQL Server Pro, however, focuses more on Microsoft's relational database management system than Windows IT Pro, which has a broader focus.

References

External links
SQL Server Pro website

Business magazines published in the United States
Monthly magazines published in the United States
Online magazines published in the United States
Defunct computer magazines published in the United States
1999 establishments in the United States
Magazines published in Colorado
Mass media in Fort Collins, Colorado
Professional and trade magazines